Dactylanthus antarcticus is a species of sea anemones in the order Actiniaria. It is the only member of its genus.

Distribution
This anemone has been found from King George Island off Antarctica and the Strait of Magellan in Chile.

References

Preactiniidae
Animals described in 1908